Mount Macduff is a  mountain summit located in the Macbeth Group of the Purcell Mountains in southeast British Columbia, Canada. The first ascent of the mountain was made in 1960 by A. Maki and Robert C. West via the southwest slope. The peak was named for Lord Macduff, a character in William Shakespeare's Macbeth. The name follows the Macbeth-theme of features surrounding the Macbeth Icefield, such as Mount Lady Macbeth, Mount Fleance, and Mount Banquo. The mountain's name was officially adopted July 17, 1962, when approved by the Geographical Names Board of Canada.


Climate
Based on the Köppen climate classification, Mount Macduff is located in a subarctic climate zone with cold, snowy winters, and mild summers. Temperatures can drop below −20 °C with wind chill factors  below −30 °C. Precipitation runoff from Mount Macduff and meltwater from its surrounding glaciers drains into tributaries of the Duncan River.

See also

Geography of British Columbia

References

External links
 Weather: Mount Macduff

Three-thousanders of British Columbia
Purcell Mountains
Kootenay Land District